The 1899 World Allround Speed Skating Championships took place at 4 and 5 February 1899 at the ice rinks Friedenauer Sportplatz & Westeisbahn in Berlin, Germany. The first day was skated at the ice rink Friedenauer Sportplatz (a 400 m ice rink). Due to the bad ice conditions the second day the distances were skated at the ice rink Westeisbahn (a 335 m ice rink).

Peder Østlund, the defending champion, succeeded in defending his championship. He won three distances and became World champion.

Allround results 

  * = Fell
 NC = Not classified
 NF = Not finished
 NS = Not started
 DQ = Disqualified
Source: SpeedSkatingStats.com

Rules 
Four distances have to be skated:
 500m
 1500m
 5000m
 10000m

One could only win the World Championships by winning at least three of the four distances, so there would be no World Champion if no skater won at least three distances.

Silver and bronze medals were not awarded.

References 

World Allround Speed Skating Championships, 1899
1899 World Allround
World Allround, 1899
Speed skating in Berlin
1899 in German sport
1890s in Berlin
February 1899 sports events